The 1999 Gombe State gubernatorial election occurred in Nigeria on January 9, 1999. The APP nominee Abubakar Habu Hashidu won the election, defeating the PDP candidate.

Abubakar Habu Hashidu emerged APP candidate.

Electoral system
The Governor of Gombe State is elected using the plurality voting system.

Primary election

APP primary
The APP primary election was won by Abubakar Habu Hashidu.

Results
The total number of registered voters in the state was 1,113,734. Total number of votes cast was 644,696, while number of valid votes was 622,379. Rejected votes were 22,317.

References 

Gombe State gubernatorial elections
Gombe State gubernatorial election
Gombe State gubernatorial election
Gombe State gubernatorial election